GEOS may refer to:

Computer software
 GEOS (8-bit operating system), an operating system originally designed for the Commodore 64
 GEOS (16-bit operating system), a DOS-based graphical user interface and x86 operating system
 GEOS (securities processing software), an integrated online system for the management and processing of securities
 GEOS (software library), an open-source geometry engine
 Goddard Earth Observing System, an Earth system model

Other
 GEOS (eikaiwa), an English conversation teaching company based in Japan
 GEOS circle, an intersection of four lines that are associated with a generalized triangle
 GEOS (satellite), a research satellite from ESRO (1978–1982)
 GEOS (satellite series), three research satellites from NASA
 Groupe GEOS, a French business consultancy